Oko sveta is a television news magazine that is broadcast across the Serbian province of Vojvodina.

Meaning of the name
The Serbian word "oko" has two meanings: eye and around, and the word "svet" means: the world, so the name can be translated in two ways as: Eye of the World and Around the World.

Production
"Oko sveta" is produced and broadcast by a regional television station "Televizija Panonija". The creators of "Oko sveta" are Milos Turinski and Danilo Redzepovic, who is also the editor and the host of the show.

Format
"Oko sveta" premiered on "Televizija Panonija" 11 February 2010. In a very short period of time, Oko sveta was barely noticed with the general audience because of its educational aspect. "Oko sveta" is run of the mill, because of the topics that occupy the main concept of the widely accepted television format. The original format includes such topics as: conspiracy theories, unbelievable discoveries and engineering structures, activities around the world, ground breaking inventions, strange ideas...

Reputation
"Oko sveta" gained a reputation with its viewers as a television show that "tells the truth" that you wouldn't occasionally see and hear on national and international television stations.

History
The idea for "Oko sveta" came about as two friends (Milos Turinski and Danilo Redzepovic) were talking about new ideas for a television show. Their main inspiration were other similar TV shows. They wanted to create a news magazine that was educational but "told the truth" about particular topics. The truth that is not broadcast in regular TV news broadcasts. For example, the truth about the 9/11 attack in New York. Danilo Redzepovic, in his research, presented ideas the suggested that the attack was a carefully and secretly planned job of the US government.

New Season
Premier of the new season of "Oko sveta" is scheduled for 5 September 2010. The new season will include completely new graphics and music with new and more shocking topics.

References

External links 
 

Serbian television series
2010 Serbian television series debuts
2010s Serbian television series
Television shows set in Serbia
Television shows filmed in Serbia